Fort View Apartments, also known as Fort Stevens Place, is an historic structure located in the Brightwood neighborhood in the Northwest Quadrant of Washington, D.C.  It was listed on the National Register of Historic Places in 2010.  The apartments, designed by George Santmyers,  overlook Fort Stevens Park.  The 62-unit complex sat empty for a number of years until it was redeveloped for over $19 million.   The project was completed in 2011.

References

Brightwood (Washington, D.C.)
Residential buildings completed in 1939
Apartment buildings in Washington, D.C.
Residential buildings on the National Register of Historic Places in Washington, D.C.